Fate of a Man (translit. Sudba Cheloveka), also released as A Man's Destiny and Destiny of a Man is a 1959 Soviet film adaptation of the short story by Mikhail Sholokhov, and also the directorial debut of Sergei Bondarchuk. In the year of its release it won the Grand Prize at the 1st Moscow International Film Festival.

Plot
With the beginning of the Great Patriotic War, driver Andrei Sokolov has to part with his family. In May 1942 he is taken prisoner by the Germans. Sokolov endures the hell of a Nazi concentration camp, but thanks to his courage he avoids execution and finally escapes from captivity behind the front line to his own. On a short front-line vacation to his small homeland Voronezh, he learns that his wife and both daughters have died during the bombing of Voronezh by German aircraft. Of those close to him, only his son remained, who became an officer. On the last day of the war, May 9, Andrei receives news that his son has died.

After the war, the lonely Sokolov works as a truck driver away from his native places - in Uryupinsk (Stalingrad Oblast). There he meets a little boy Vanya, who was left an orphan: the boy's mother died during the bombing, and his father went missing during the war. Sokolov decides to tell the boy that he is his father, and by doing so he gives himself and the boy hope for a new happy family life.

Cast
 Sergei Bondarchuk as Andrei Sokolov
 Pavel Boriskin as Vanya
 Zinaida Kiriyenko as Irina, Sokolov's wife
 Pavel Volkov as Ivan Timofeyevich, Sokolov's neighbor
 Yuri Averin as Müller
 Kirill Alekseyev as German Major
 Pavel Vinnik as Soviet Colonel
 Lev Borisov as platoon
 Georgy Millyar as drunk German soldier
 Yevgeny Morgunov as fat German soldier (uncredited)

References

External links
 

1959 directorial debut films
1959 films
1950s Russian-language films
1959 war films
Films about adoption
Films based on Russian novels
Films directed by Sergei Bondarchuk
Films set in Russia
Films set in the Soviet Union
Films shot in Russia
Eastern Front of World War II films
Russian black-and-white films
Russian World War II films
Soviet black-and-white films
Soviet war films
Soviet World War II films
Mosfilm films